Xia Yu (born 28 October 1976) is a Chinese actor. At the age of 18 years, he rose to international prominence after winning the Best Actor award at the Venice Film Festival in 1994 for his leading role in the film In the Heat of the Sun and became the youngest actor to win that award in the history of the Venice Film Festival.

Biography
Xia Yu was born on 28 October 1976 in Qingdao, Shandong Province. His father was once an actor and then became a painter.

Xia was initially discovered by Jiang Wen who cast him in his semi-autobiographical film In the Heat of the Sun (1994). Despite being chosen partly because of his facial resemblance to a young Jiang, Xia's spirited and moving performance as a renegade youth conquered audiences. He was rocketed to international stardom after he won the Best Actor award from the Venice Film Festival (the youngest actor to win that award in the history of the festival), Singapore International Film Festival and Golden Horse Awards.

Xia wanted to study drama after his first film, he was accepted into the Central Academy of Drama. After completing his studies there, Xia remained an active force in Chinese cinema as well as television, appearing in many films and television series. Xia's second film Shadow Magic demonstrated his talent as an actor and earned him a nomination for Best Actor at the Tokyo International Film Festival. His earlier film credits also includes  Roots and Branches (2001) and Where Have All the Flowers Gone (2002). Xia's subsequent films, The Law of Romance (2003) won him a Golden Rooster Award for Best Actor and Waiting Alone (2005) earned him Best Actor at the Beijing College Student Film Festival. With five best actor titles at international film festivals, Xia Yu has been named one of the top 4 hottest young actors in China.

Like many of today′s actors in China, Xia Yu also has an extensive TV career, appearing on such shows as Records of Kangxi's Travel Incognito, Classical Romance and Sky Lovers. Most of Xia′s TV roles have been secondary ones until he was cast to star in The Ugliest In the World, where he played Liu Baoshan, a genius of the Qing Dynasty who gave up the opportunity to become an official in order to become a clown.

Aside from local productions, Xia has also starred in two Hollywood films; China: The Panda Adventure (2001) and The Painted Veil (2006). Xia also starred alongside Shilpa Shetty in the Indian-Chinese film The Desire (2010). In 2016, he took on the role of Wong Jack-man in the Bruce Lee biopic Birth of the Dragon, produced by American filmmaker George Nolfi.

In 2017, Xia reunited with Waiting Alone director Dayyan Eng in fantasy comedy film Wished, which became one of the highest-grossing domestic comedy titles for the summer season.

In 2019, it was announced that Xia will play Shen Gongbao in the upcoming fantasy film series Fengshen Trilogy directed by Wuershan. The film is based on the novel Investiture of the Gods.

Personal life
Xia Yu married actress Yuan Quan in 2009, a decade after their first date as students in Central Academy of Drama. They have appeared in 4 films together: The Law of Romance (2003), Waiting Alone (2004), Shanghai Rumba (2006) and Breakup Buddies (2014). Their daughter was born on 31 March  2010.

Xia is an avid skateboarder. He fell in love with skateboarding after watching it in Gleaming the Cube, a popular movie when he was young. He finds time to board whenever he is between sets shooting a film. In 2003, Xia began to ski and loved it. In 2006, Xia won the championship of a snowboarding game in amateur group in Lucerne, Switzerland.

Filmography

Film

Television series

Awards and nominations

References

External links

1976 births
20th-century Chinese male actors
21st-century Chinese male actors
Living people
Central Academy of Drama alumni
Chinese male film actors
Chinese male television actors
Male actors from Qingdao
Volpi Cup for Best Actor winners